Contemporary Literature is a quarterly peer-reviewed academic journal which publishes interviews with notable and developing authors, scholarly essays, and reviews of recent books critiquing the contemporary literature field. Genre coverage includes poetry, the novel, drama, creative nonfiction, and new media (including digital literature and the graphic narrative). The editor-in-chief is Thomas Schaub (University of Wisconsin–Madison). It was established in 1960 as the Wisconsin Studies in Contemporary Literature, obtaining its current title in 1968.

Abstracting and indexing 
The journal is abstracted and indexed by:

References

External links 
 

Literary magazines published in the United States
University of Wisconsin Press academic journals
Quarterly journals
English-language journals
Publications established in 1960